Louis Lagassé (born December 14, 1947) is a Canadian businessman, notary, investor, and philanthropist. In 2004, he was made a member of the Order of Canada, Canada's highest civilian honor. Lagassé is best known for founding several companies including C-MAC Industries, CELL Foods Inc., Media5 Corporation, MSBI Capital Inc and Mediatrix, a software production company and advanced IP telephony equipment production company. In 1995, Lagassé has created JA Louis Lagassé Foundation, to promote and develop the arts, music, philanthropy, science and culture and to support any effort to popularize and initiation in these and areas, primarily in the region.

He received the Merit Estrien in 2008. He received the Gold Medal of the Jubilee of Queen Elizabeth II in 2002, the Medal for the 125th Anniversary of Canada (2000), Medal of Queen Elizabeth II Diamond Jubilee (2012), Medal of Honor of the House of Notaires (2011). He also invested in several projects, including the acquisition of the Granada Theatre in the City of Sherbrooke.

In January 2020 he was sentenced to 3 years of prison in France.

Education and early career
Louis Lagassé received a Bachelor of Arts from Jean-de-Brébeuf College in 1967, he then attended the University of Salzburg in Austria to obtain a Diploma in Languages. In 1970, he proceeded to the University of Montreal, where he completed LL.B. and earned a degree in MBA from University of Western Ontario in 1973. In 1975, Lagassé joined his father, Jacques Lagassé, as a partner of the Lagassé notaries and In 1998 Lagassé also received an honorary degree from the University of Sherbrooke.

Professional achievements
Lagassé began teaching as a visiting professor at the Faculty of Law of the University of Sherbrooke from 1975 to 1977. Further on several occasions, he was appointed to give lectures to advanced courses of the Chamber of Notaries of Quebec.

In 1985 Lagassé co-founded C-MAC Industries Inc. which he took control in 1987 with other investor Dennis Wood. Within the ten years company’s product grab major world markets and generate more than 600 direct jobs in Sherbrooke. In February 1998, he founded the Centre of Entrepreneurship Dobson-Lagassé in partnership with Bishop's University, to help the inception of entrepreneurship among Canadian youth in the Eastern Townships. In 2000, he took the leadership of the co-founded company Mediatrix Telecom, Inc., that specializes in voice over IP technology with offices in Sherbrooke and Montreal, he also founded M5T Centre of Excellence in Telecom to promote the development of this technology. It moved into international markets, forming its subsidiaries in the US and Europe.

April 1, 2005, it acquired an assembly plant telecommunications products in Brittany, France, employed more than 200 people and it becomes Lagassé Communications & Industries SAS.

On 1 December 2006, he acquired in Germany the latter sister company which takes the name of Lagassé Communications & Industries GmbH. With these two plants, the number of employees exceeds 1,000 people. As an officer, president, chief directions or tips member, Lagassé is affiliated or has been affiliated to a multitude of companies and institutions.

Career
 Partner of the firm Sylvestre Lagassé, notaries and legal advisors (1975 to present)
 Co-founder of C-MAC Industries Inc. (1985)
 Co-founder of the Centre d'Entrepreneurship Dobson-Lagassé (Bishop's University) (1995 to present)
 Founder of Groupe Lagassé Inc .
 Founder of Foods Cell Inc, Montreal.
 The real estate group founder Montagnais
 Board member Quebec Growth Fund Inc. (1994-2000)
 Member of the Advisory Committee S.G.F. Tech Inc. (2000-2003)
 Member of the Advisory Committee of NSW Inc. Control (2000-2003)
 He established the JA Louis Lagassé Foundation, a philanthropic foundation in the arts

Boards / Presidencies
 Management Portland Vimy Inc. (Chairman)
 Media5 Corporation (President. Ac)
 Gexel Telecom International Inc.
 Cell Foods Inc. (Founder and President)
 Vice-Chairman of the Board of Directors of Hydro-Quebec; Member of the Executive Committee, member of the Finance Committee, Chair of the Financial Management Committee Retirement Plan
 M.S.B.I. Capital Inc15. (2001 to present); Chairman of the Investment Committee
 National Arts Centre (Adm.) (2000-2004)
 Foresbec Inc. (1987-2007)
 The Penrod Company16, Virginia (1990 to present)
 The Council for Business and the Arts in Canada (2004-2008)
 Physicians for Peace, Virginia (1998-2008)
 Governor of the International Institute of Telecommunications, Canada (1996-2006)
 Founding President of Innopole17 Sherbrooke (2008-2010)

References

External links
Personal website

Members of the Order of Canada
1947 births
Living people
Businesspeople from Sherbrooke